The Ewing and Muriel Kauffman Memorial Garden is a 2-acre botanic garden and part of the Kauffman Legacy Park, located in Kansas City, Missouri. It is maintained in a collaborative effort by the Ewing Marion Kauffman Foundation and Powell Gardens.  The gardens are located near Country Club Plaza and the main campus of University of Missouri–Kansas City. The Kauffman Memorial Garden is enclosed by limestone walls and has brick paths and seating areas. The garden showcases five designs.

Five Designs
The Allee:  Peking Tree Lilacs shading billowing blue Endless Summer Hydrangeas and other seasonal flowers are found in the entrance of the garden. Allee is a French word meaning, "a walkway lined with trees or tall shrubs."

Green Garden:  The Green Garden’s centerpiece is where water jumps in a playful octagonal pool. It is bordered on the south by a beautiful pergola of overhead planter boxes filled with cascading seasonal flowers that create a space where Mrs. Kauffman’s favorite flower, the gardenia, can be found during the growing season. Four beds surround each corner of the garden containing spring-blooming magnolias.

Orangery:  The “orangery” flanks the north side of the green garden and offers a sheltered gathering place for visitors and a site for fragrant seasonal plants, and in winter, the garden's citrus, camellia and gardenia collections. The garden's orchid collection can also be found in the "boots" of the orangery's four large pindo palm trees. The Orangery's annual winter holiday display is a seasonal highlight, and a must-see during a Plaza area visit.

Parterre Garden:  The Parterre “Canal” Garden is home to a majestic long pool, where bronze figures Jazz I and Jazz II, by local artist Tom Corbin dance in the water. The long canal pool is lined with a colorful display of annuals and tropicals that change with each season. Paths behind rows of flowering crabapples feature long borders of beautiful perennials.

Secret Garden:  The secluded Secret Garden behind the conservatory features its own distinctive watery accents and a quiet spot for reflection.

Memorial
The Memorial site of Kansas City business and philanthropists Ewing Kauffman and Muriel Kauffman are interred at the garden.
The Kauffmans’ world travels inspired the creation of the garden for the enjoyment and enrichment of the community. The space artfully includes plants from both Muriel and Ewing’s heritage by using species popular to Canada and Missouri.

All together, the garden features 7,000 plants, varieties that include vintage and modern perennials, annuals, shrubs, bulbs and trees. Local volunteers and gardeners, in association with Powell Gardens are responsible for daily care.

Image gallery

External links
 Ewing and Muriel Kauffman Memorial Garden official web page at the Ewing and Marion Kauffman Foundation
 Powell Gardens regional projects web page covering upkeep and details of garden

See also 
 List of botanical gardens and arboretums in Missouri

References

https://www.merriam-webster.com/dictionary/all%C3%A9e
Botanical gardens in Missouri
Tourist attractions in Kansas City, Missouri